Kevin Piscopo (born 6 February 1998) is an Italian professional footballer who plays as a forward for Pordenone.

Club career

Genoa 
Born in Vercelli, Piscopo was a youth exponent of Genoa.

Loan to Montecatini 
On 31 August 2016, Piscopo was signed by Serie D club Montecatini on a season-long loan. On 4 September, Piscopo made his debut in Serie D and he scored his first goal for Montecatini and the winning goal in the 51st minute of a 1–0 away win over Argentina Arma, he was replaced after the 71 minutes. On 11 September he played his first entire match for Montecatini, a 2–2 home draw against Ponsacco. On 2 October, Piscopo scored his second goal in the 45th minute of a 3–1 away win over Sestri Levante. On 13 November he scored his third goal in the 86th minute of a 1–1 home draw against Gavorrano. On 16 November, Piscopo made his first hat-trick in his career, in a 3–2 away win over Sporting Recco. On 9 April 2017 he scored his tenth goal in the 29th minute of a 3–2 away defeat against Lavagnese. Piscopo ended his season-long loan to Montecatini with 33 appearances and 13 goals.

Loan to Carrarese 
On 20 July 2017, Piscopo was loaned to Serie C club Carrarese on a season-long loan deal. On 27 August he made his Serie C debut for Carrarese in a 1–0 away win over Cuneo, he played the entire match. On 10 September, Piscopo scored his first goal for Carrarese, as a substitute, in the 72nd minute of a 4–3 away defeat against Viterbese Castrense. On 4 October he scored his second goal in the 40th minute of a 5–2 away win over Prato. On 21 April 2018 he scored his third goal, as a substitute, in the 75th minute of a 1–1 home draw against Pistoiese. Piscopo ended his season-long loan to Carrarese with 21 appearances and 3 goals.

On 12 July 2018 he returned on loan to Carrarese for another season. On 29 July he started his second season with Carrarese as a substitute replacing Tommaso Biasci in the 71st minute of a 1–0 home defeat against Imolese in the first round of Coppa Italia. On 16 September he played his first Serie C match of the season as a substitute replacing Tommaso Biasci in the 46th minute of a 5–1 away win over Arzachena. One week later, on 23 September, he scored twice in a 4–0 home win over Juventus U23. On 27 September he scored his third goal, as a substitute, in the 85th minute of a 2–2 away draw against Lucchese. Three days later, on 30 September, he played his first entire match of the season, a 2–1 home win over Pro Patria. Piscopo ended his second loan to Carrarese with 38 appearances, 9 goals and 6 assists.

Empoli
On 8 July 2019, Piscopo signed to Serie B side Empoli. On 5 October he made his debut for the club as a substitute replacing Stefano Moreo in the 75th minute of a 2–0 away defeat against Pordenone. Two weeks later, on 20 October, he played his first entire match for the club, a 1–1 home draw against Cremonese.

Loans to Carrarese
On 15 January 2020, he joined Carrarese once again on loan until the end of the season. Four days later, on 19 January, Piscopo made his league debut for the club as a substitute replacing Cassio Cardoselli in the 66th minute of a 3–1 home win over Robur Siena. On 17 July he scored his first goal of the season, as a substitute, in the 92nd minute of a 2–1 away defeat after extra-time in the play-off semi-final against Bari. Piscopo ended his 6-month loan to Carrarese with 7 appearances, all as a substitute, including 2 in the play-off matches, and 1 goal. After appearing for Empoli as a late substitute in their 2020–21 Serie B opening game against Frosinone and, also as a substitute, in the Coppa Italia game against Renate, on 5 October 2020 he was loaned to Carrarese once again.

Loans to SPAL and Renate
On 31 August 2021, he joined SPAL on loan. On 19 January 2022, he moved on a new loan to Serie C club Renate. Renate will hold an obligation to purchase his rights if the club gets promoted to Serie B for the 2022–23 season.

Pordenone
On 1 July 2022, Piscopo joined Pordenone on a three-year contract.

Career statistics

Club

References

External links
 

1998 births
People from Vercelli
Living people
Italian footballers
Carrarese Calcio players
Empoli F.C. players
S.P.A.L. players
A.C. Renate players
Pordenone Calcio players
Serie B players
Serie C players
Serie D players
Association football forwards
Footballers from Piedmont
Sportspeople from the Province of Vercelli